Musicians at the Edinburgh International Festival, 1947 to 1957 lists the major artists who have appeared at the Edinburgh International Festival.

Orchestras and groups from Scotland, Britain, Europe and America were all invited to perform.

From the beginning the Scottish Orchestra, now known as the Royal Scottish National Orchestra, and BBC Scottish Orchestra were present, joined by the Royal Philharmonic Orchestra, Philharmonia Orchestra, London Philharmonic Orchestra, and Hallé Orchestra,

Major European orchestras included the Vienna Philharmonic, the Vienna Hofmusikkapelle, the Berlin Philharmonic, the Orchestre de la Suisse Romande, Orchestra of La Scala, Milan, Concertgebouw Orchestra, and the Orchestre national de la Radiodiffusion française, now called the Orchestre National de France.

From America came the Philharmonic Symphony Orchestra of New York, now known as the  New York Philharmonic, and the Boston Symphony Orchestra.

Each orchestra or group came with celebrated conductors and soloists, many of whom are still famous today as their recordings remain the standard by which contemporary musicians are judged.

1947

1948

1949

1950

1951

1952

1953

1954

1955

1956

See also
Edinburgh International Festival
World premieres at the Edinburgh International Festival
Musicians at the Edinburgh International Festival, 1957–1966
Opera at the Edinburgh International Festival: history and repertoire, 1947–1956
Opera at the Edinburgh International Festival: history and repertoire, 1957–1966
Opera at the Edinburgh International Festival: history and repertoire, 1967–1976
Ballet at the Edinburgh International Festival: history and repertoire, 1947–1956
Ballet at the Edinburgh International Festival: history and repertoire, 1957–1966
Ballet at the Edinburgh International Festival: history and repertoire, 1967–1976
Drama at the Edinburgh International Festival: history and repertoire, 1947–1956
Drama at the Edinburgh International Festival: history and repertoire, 1957–1966
Visual Arts at the Edinburgh International Festival, 1947–1976

References

Edinburgh Festival
Music-related lists
Classical music festivals in Scotland
Annual events in Edinburgh
1947 music festivals
1948 music festivals
1949 music festivals
1950 music festivals
1951 music festivals
1952 music festivals
1953 music festivals
1954 music festivals
1955 music festivals
1956 music festivals